Purba Ranaghat is a census town within the jurisdiction of the Mathurapur police station in the Mathurapur I CD block in the Diamond Harbour subdivision of the South 24 Parganas district in the Indian state of West Bengal.

Geography

Area overview
Diamond Harbour subdivision is a rural subdivision with patches of urbanization. Only 14.61% of the population lives in the urban areas and an overwhelming 85.39% lives in the rural areas. In the eastern portion of the subdivision (shown in the map alongside) there are 24 census towns. The entire district is situated in the Ganges Delta and the eastern part of the district is a flat plain area with small towns, many in clusters. Location of places in the larger map varies a little. It is an OpenStreetMap, while we are using coordinates as in Google Maps.

Note: The map alongside presents some of the notable locations in the subdivision. All places marked in the map are linked in the larger full screen map.

Location

Demographics
According to the 2011 Census of India, Purba Ranaghat had a total population of 5,207 of which 2,705 (52%) were males and 2,502 (48%) were females. There were 724 persons in the age range of 0–6 years. The total number of literate persons in Purba Ranaghat was 3,166 (70.62% of the population over 6 years).

Infrastructure
According to the District Census Handbook 2011, Purba Ranaghat covered an area of 1.8488 km2. Among the physical aspects, there is a railway station at Mathurapur Road 5 km away. Among the civic amenities, the protected water supply involved uncovered wells, tap water from untreated sources. It had 410 domestic electric connections. Among the medical facilities it had 2 hospitals. Among the educational facilities it had were 1 primary school, 1 secondary school, the nearest senior secondary school  at Mathurapur, South 24 Parganas 12 km away. An important commodity it produced was rice.

Transport
Bishnupur-Raidighi Road links Purba Ranaghat to the State Highway 1.

Mathurapur Road railway station is located nearby.

Education
Ranaghata High School is a Bengali-medium coeducational institution established in 1965. It has facilities for teaching from class V to class X. It is housed in a rented building. It has a library with 1,000 books and 10 computers.

Healthcare
Mathurapur Rural Hospital at Mathurapur, with 60 beds, is the major government medical facility in the Mathurapur I CD block.

References

Cities and towns in South 24 Parganas district